Nikita Mishin (born 1971) is a Russian billionaire businessman, who with Konstantin Nikolaev and Andrey Filatov, owns one-third of Globaltrans, Russia's largest train operator.

Early life and career
Mishin received his bachelor's degree from Moscow State University.

He is the founder of Severstaltrans, and a former member of the Expert Council of Russia. He acquired Cypriot citizenship in 2015.

In December 2017, he sold his shares in Global Ports, exiting the port business.

References

Living people
1971 births
Cypriot billionaires
Russian billionaires
Russian business executives
Naturalized citizens of Cyprus
Russian oligarchs
Moscow State University alumni
Russian businesspeople in Cyprus